Peñalver is a municipality located in the province of Guadalajara, Castile-La Mancha, Spain.

The main activities are agriculture and the production of honey.

References

Municipalities in the Province of Guadalajara